The Cystofilobasidiaceae are a family of fungi in the order Cystofilobasidiales. Phylogenetic analyses shows that this family is clearly distinct from other yeast-like families of the Tremellomycetes.

The GBIF, list 6 genus in the family;
 Cystofilobasidium  (24)
 Guehomyces  
 Itersonilia  (9)
 Phaffia  (8)
 Rhodozyma  
 Xanthophyllomyces  (4)

Figures in brackets are approx. how many species per genus.

References

Tremellomycetes
Cystofilobasidiaceae